The 2019–20 Texas Southern Tigers basketball team represented Texas Southern University during the 2019–20 NCAA Division I men's basketball season. The Tigers, led by second-year head coach Johnny Jones, played their home games at the Health and Physical Education Arena in Houston, Texas as members of the Southwestern Athletic Conference. They finished the season 16–16, 12–6 in SWAC play to finish in third place. They defeated Grambling State in the quarterfinals of the SWAC tournament. They were set to face Southern in the semifinals until the remainder of the tournament was cancelled amid the COVID-19 pandemic.

Previous season
The Tigers finished the 2018–19 season 24–14 overall, 14–4 in SWAC play, to finish in three-way tie for 3rd place. In the SWAC tournament, they defeated Southern in the quarterfinals, Alabama State in the semifinals., advancing to the championship game, where they lost to Prairie View A&M. They were invited to the CIT, where they defeated New Orleans in the first round, Texas–Rio Grande Valley in the second round, Louisiana–Monroe in the quarterfinals, before falling to Green Bay in the semifinals.

Roster

Schedule and results

|-
!colspan=12 style=| Non-conference regular season

|-
!colspan=9 style=| SWAC regular season

|-
!colspan=12 style=| SWAC tournament
|-

|- style="background:#bbbbbb"
| style="text-align:center"|March 13, 20208:30 pm, ESPN3
| style="text-align:center"| (3)
| vs. (2) SouthernSemifinals
| colspan=2 rowspan=1 style="text-align:center"|Cancelled due to the COVID-19 pandemic
| style="text-align:center"|Bartow ArenaBirmingham, AL
|-

Source

References

Texas Southern Tigers basketball seasons
Texas Southern
Texas Southern Tigers basketball
Texas Southern Tigers basketball